Old bill or Old Bill may refer to:

 Slang for a police officer or for law enforcement in the United Kingdom
 Old Bill (comics), a cartoon character created in 1914–15 by Bruce Bairnsfather
 The Better 'Ole or The Romance of Old Bill, 1917 stage musical comedy based on the cartoon character
 The Romance of Old Bill, 1918 British silent film based on the play
 Old Bill Williams (1787-1849), American mountain man and frontiersman

See also
 
 Poor Old Bill, 1931 British comedy film